Karima Dirèche is a French Algerian historian specialising in the contemporary history of the Maghreb. From September 2013 to August 2017, she has been the director of the Institute for Research on the Contemporary Maghreb in Tunis.

Education
Dirèche studied history and philosophy at the University of Provence, earning a doctorate in 1992 with a thesis on emigration from Kabylie to France. She has academic qualifications in historical geography and in history. Her habilitation thesis on Fabriquer de l’histoire et créer du sens. Enjeux mémoriels et affirmations identitaires dans l’Afrique post-indépendante ("To manufacture history and create meaning. Issues of memory and affirmations of identity in post-independence Africa") was accepted at Aix-Marseille University in 2012 and constitutes a critical historiographic analysis of national narratives in Algerian society since 1962.

Career
Dirèche is a research director at the Centre national de la recherche scientifique. After teaching in colleges and public lycées, she joined CNRS in 2005 as a researcher at the TELEMME centre (: "Time, Space and Languages: Southern and Mediterranean Europe") at the Maison méditerranéenne des sciences de l'homme in Aix-en-Provence.

She has taught at the School for Advanced Studies in the Social Sciences in Paris, the University of Aix-Marseille and the School of Government and Economy in Rabat, and served as research director at the Institute of Political Sciences at the International University of Rabat.

Her research focusses on migration (of Algerians and Comoro Islanders) in the colonial and post-colonial periods and has included issues of post-independence historical narrative in the Maghreb, issues of religion (Judaism, Christianity, and conversion) in Algeria and Morocco, and the question of Berber identity. Her recent research has focussed on two issues: neo-evangelical conversion in the Maghreb and the resultant political and religious issues, and Jewish memory in contemporary Algeria.

Other activities
 European Council on Foreign Relations (ECFR), Member

References

-	2016, (à paraître), La vulgate berbère en Algérie : savoirs, usages et projections, in Les Amazighs dans la tourmente des pays arabes  (sous la direction de Thierry Desrues et Mohand Tilmatine)

-	2016 « Où en est la « Révolution de Jasmin » » ?, Les Collections de l’Histoire, n°70 ;

-	2014, « Les Chrétiens au Maghreb. Etat des lieux et perspectives », in Le livre noir du christianisme, Editions XO, Paris ;

-	2014, « Nation algérienne ou nation musulmane » ? Une approche historique, in Lieux de l’histoire, territoires de l’historien (sous la direction de Daho Djerbal et de JihaneSfeir), Naqd(Revue critique algérienne des sciences sociales) ;

-	2014, « Le Maghreb politique », EncyclopediaUniversalis ;

-	2012, “La question coloniale et postcoloniale en Algérie », http://www.medmem.eu/;

-	2012,  « Jésus et Muhammad: des fois en dissonance? Discours des convertis néo-évangéliques sur l’islam dans l’Algérie d’aujourd’hui », in Jésus, moi et les autres (sous la direction de Christophe Pons,), Editions du CNRS,);

-	2011, « Le paradoxe algérien », Revue italienne d’histoire contemporaine ;

-	 2011, « Mondialisation des espaces néo-évangéliques au Maghreb. Controverses religieuses et débats politiques », Méditerranée Revue géographique des pays méditerranéens;

-	2011, Néo-évangélistes au Maroc. Quelles réalités ?, L’Année marocaine, 2011,  http://www.cjb.ma/289-les-collections-du-cjb/9-l-annee-marocaine/1363-neo-evangelistes-au-maroc-quelles-realites-1363.html;

-	2010, « Les murchidât aux Maroc : entre islam d’Etat et islam au féminin », Revue des Mondes Musulmans et de la Méditerranée, Edisud, 2010 ;

-	2011, «Coloniser et évangéliser en Algérie : les dessous d’un mythe », in Christianisme en terres musulmanes, (sous la direction de Bernard Heyberger et de Rémy Madinier), Editions Karthala ;

-	2010, « Enjeux idéologiques et savoirs historiques : réflexion autour de la guerre d’Algérie », in La circulation des savoirs (sous la direction d’Eberhart Kienle), Editions Karthala;

-	2009, « Evangélisation en Algérie : débats sur la liberté de culte », in L’Année du Maghreb, Editions du CNRS ;

-	2009, «Convertir les Kabyles. Quelles réalités ? », in Religion et Colonisation, Afrique, Océanie, Amériques, XVIe-XXème siècles (sous la direction de Dominique Borne et Benoît Falaize), les Editions de l’Atelier ;

-	2009, « Dolorisme religieux et reconstructions identitaires. Les conversions néo-évangéliques dans l'Algérie contemporaine», Annales. Histoire et Sciences sociales, n°5, septembre-octobre 2009, Editions de l'EHESS, diffusion Armand Colin ;

-	2005, « Le mouvement des ‘arch en Algérie : pour une alternative démocratique autonome ? », Revue des Mondes musulmans et de la Méditerranée, Edisud;

-	« Chrétiens kabyles » et « Emigration kabyle », notices dans L’Encyclopédie Berbère, Edisud, 2004 ;

-	« Les Pères Blancs ou la Société des missionnaires d’Afrique », in Dictionnaire biographique de la Kabylie, sous la direction de Salem Chaker, INALCO, EDISUD, 2001 ;

-	«L’Islam marseillais ou l’itinéraire d’un imam comorien », Les Comoriens de France, in Hommes et Migrations, septembre-octobre 1998, n° 1215 ;

-	« Les enjeux de l’école, des attentes encore non formulées », Les Comoriens de France, in  Hommes et Migrations, septembre-octobre 1998, n° 1215 ;

-	« Regards missionnaires et monde touareg », Touaregs et autres sahariens, sous la direction d’Hélène Claudot-Hawad, in Les Cahiers de l’IREMAM, Aix-en-Provence, 1996 ;

-	«Langue et identité dans la communauté kabyle de Marseille », in Etudes et documents berbères, n°7, Paris, 1990 ;

Actes de colloque

-	2014, Algerian jews : how to make the return journey ? in migrations borders(sous la direction de S. Mourlane et P. Sintes, Editions PIE, Peter Lang, Oxford ;

-	2012, Texte d’introduction, La bienvenue et l’adieu. Migrants juifs et musulmans au Maghreb (XVème-XXème sicle), Actes du colloque d’Essaouira, Editions La croisée du chemin ;

-	2010, « Quand la torture s’oublie. Réflexion sur une amnésie d’Etat (l’exemple de la guerre d’Algérie», in Les échelles de la mémoire en Méditerranée, (sous la direction de Maryline Crivello), Actes Sud/MMSH, 2010 ;

-	2008, « Graine d’archives. Quand l’histoire me raconte », in Récits, Histoire, Individus (sous la direction de Maryline Crivello et Jean-Noël Pelen), Presses Universitaires de Provence;

-	2008, « Convoquer le passé et réécrire l’histoire. Berbérité ou amazighité dans l’histoire de l’Algérie », in Chantiers et défis de la recherche sur le Maghreb contemporain, Editions Karthala- IRMC ;

-	2008, « Les écoles catholiques dans la Kabylie du XIXème siècle : entre évangélisation et assimilation», Les Cahiers de la Méditerranée, Centre de la Méditerranée moderne et contemporaine (CMMC), Université de Nice Sophia Antipolis;

-	« Quand les missionnaires rencontrent l’islam berbère : cécité coloniale et malentendus dans l’Algérie coloniale de la fin du XIXème siècle », In Pour une histoire critique et citoyenne : le cas de l’histoire franco-algérienne, Lyon, en ligne http://w3.ens-lsh.fr/colloques.france-algérie;

-	1999, « Orphelins et convertis ; le discours des missionnaires sur la formation des nouvelles élites au Sahara à la période coloniale », in Nomadic Peoples, novembre 1999 ;

-	1999, « Histoire de la question berbère en Algérie : les modalités d’une construction identitaire », Langues et Cultures au Maghreb, in Prologues (Revue maghrébine du livre), septembre 1999 ;

-	1999, « Ferdinand Duchêne ou la Kabylie transfigurée », Littératures coloniales. Métamorphoses du regard sur la Méditerranée et l’Afrique, sous la direction de J.R Henry et Lucienne Martini, EDISUD, Mémoires Méditerranéennes;

-	1992, «Endogamie et intégration. Analyse des attitudes face au mariage des jeunes marseillais d’origine kabyle ». Anthropologie de l’immigration in Les Cahiers de l’IREMAM, Aix-en-Provence;
CD-Rom :

-	L’Europe et le monde dominé : échanges, colonisations, confrontations, (documents, séquences pédagogiques, préparation au BAC), Editions Jériko, collection Histoire, 2007, cédérom pc, classe de 1ère.

-	La colonisation européenne et le partage du monde au XIXème siècle, Editions Jeriko, Collection Histoire, 2006, cédérom pc, classe de 4ème.

-	L’Europe et les nations 1815-1914. Les mouvements nationaux et libéraux (documents, Séquences pédagogiques), Editions Jériko, Collection Histoire, 2006, cédérom PC, classe de 4ème,

Further reading 
http://mediterranee.revues.org/5390
 http://www.cairn.info/revue-annales-2009-5-page-1137.htm

Living people
Year of birth missing (living people)